Kuwait's fifth district is the country's fifth district. It consists of 20 residential areas including Fahaheel, Ahmadi, Sabahiya, Rigga and the district extends down south to Wafra and Al-Zour.

Areas of the Fifth District 

Ahmadi
Hadiya
Fintas & Mahboula
Abu Halifa
Funaitees, Messila & Sabah Al Salem Area
Riqqa
Sabahiya
Dhaher
Egaila
Qurain
Adan
Al-Qusour
Mubarak Al-Kabeer
Fahad Al-Ahmad
Jaber Al-Ali
Fahaheel
Mangaf
Ali Sabah Al Salem
Al Zour
Wafra

Picture

References 
The areas are officially stated by Ministry of Interior circular. (The numbering above is also by the Ministry of Interior)

Politics of Kuwait
Electoral districts of Kuwait